Disbelief (sometimes decapitalized to "disbelief") is a German heavy metal band from Hesse. Their music is rooted in death metal, but has melancholic tendencies.

History 
The band was formed in 1990, but did not become one solid line-up for several years. They began with Karsten Jäger, Oliver Lenz, and drummer Markus Gnap, with guitarist/bassist Denis Musiol joining later. They released their first demo the following year. After two more demo tapes, five years, and the replacement of Gnap and Musiol with Tommy Fritsch, Jochen Trunk, and Kai Bergerin, they released their self-titled album in 1997. Their second album, Infected, was released in 1998. A year later, they replaced Fritsch with Jan-Dirk Löffler and received a new recording contract from Massacre Records. After a few more albums, they became signed to Nuclear Blast, which distributed their 2004 record, Spreading the Rage, to North America and helped them to gain a wider fanbase. After reinstating Fritsch into the band, they released 66Sick in 2005, also in North America. Lenz left the band in late 2006 and was replaced by Jonas Khalil; however, the band's seventh album, Navigator, was still released in late February 2007.

Following the release of their eighth album Protected Hell in 2009 and their debut EP Heal! in 2010, singer Karsten Jager would join fellow German death metal band Morgoth as their new lead vocalist in 2014 following Marc Grewe's last-minute departure, providing vocals for their reunion album Ungod, released in 2015. He would perform with both Morgoth and Disbelief for the next several years until the former's official permanent breakup in 2020, during which time the band released their first album in 8 years, The Symbol of Death, in 2017, and their tenth studio album The Ground Collapses in 2020.

Members

Current members
 Karsten "Jagger" Jäger – vocals 
 Jochen "Joe" Trunk – bass 
 David "Dave" Renner – guitars 
 Fabian "Fab" Regmann – drums

Previous members
 Markus Gnap – drums 
 Marius Pack – guitars 
 Oliver "Olly" Lenz – guitars 
 Denis Musiol – guitars, bass 
 Kai Bergerin – drums 
 Tommy Fritsch – guitars 
 Jan-Dirk Löffler – guitars 
 Jonas Khalil – guitars 
 Witali Weber – guitars 
 Alejandro Varela – guitars 
 Cornelius Althammer – drums 
 Wolfgang Rothbauer – guitars 
 Alexander Hagenauer – guitars 
 Sandro "Drumster" Schulze – drums

Timeline

Discography 
 Disbelief (1997)
 Infected (1999)
 Worst Enemy (2001)
 Shine (2002)
 Spreading the Rage (2003)
 66Sick (2005)
 Navigator (2007)
 Protected Hell (2009)
 Heal (2010)
 The Symbol of Death (2017)
 The Ground Collapses (2020)

References

External links

 

German death metal musical groups
German heavy metal musical groups
Musical groups established in 1990
Nuclear Blast artists
Massacre Records artists